Miguel Flaño Bezunartea (born 19 August 1984) is a Spanish former professional footballer who played as a central defender, currently scout of Osasuna.

He represented Spain up to under-23 level, and spent the better part of his career with Osasuna, totalling 338 official appearances for the club over 15 years.

Club career

Osasuna
Flaño was born in Pamplona. A product of hometown CA Osasuna's youth ranks, he made his first-team debut on 18 September 2004 in a 3–2 La Liga home win against Real Betis, finishing his debut season with seven games. Aged only 17, he began playing regularly with the reserves in the Segunda División B.

Flaño scored his first goal for the Navarrese on 9 June 2007, in the 5–0 away victory over Betis. He added two appearances in the club's semi-final run in the UEFA Cup.

From then on, Flaño became an essential defensive fixture with the side as twin brother Javier, who had been a starter from 2005 to 2007, gradually lost his importance, leaving after the 2008–09 campaign, where Miguel netted four times in 33 matches in an eventual narrow escape from relegation. He eventually renewed his contract in August 2009, running until 2013.

Flaño again agreed to an extension at Osasuna on 7 June 2012, now until 2017. In 2015–16, he started in all his 34 league appearances to help the club return to the top flight after a two-year absence.

In the early stages of the following season, both siblings suffered a complete rupture of the anterior cruciate ligament on their left knee, being sidelined for several months. In the following years he was only a backup option, featuring rarely.

Córdoba
On 28 January 2019, the 34-year-old Flaño agreed to a short-term deal with Segunda División side Córdoba CF after terminating his contract. After retiring later the same year, he returned to Osasuna as a scout.

Personal life
Flaño's twin brother, Javier, was also a footballer and a defender. Both were groomed at Osasuna.

Honours
Osasuna
Segunda División: 2018–19

Spain U16
UEFA European Under-16 Championship: 2001

Spain U23
Mediterranean Games: 2005

References

External links
Osasuna official profile 

1984 births
Living people
Spanish twins
Twin sportspeople
Spanish footballers
Footballers from Pamplona
Association football defenders
La Liga players
Segunda División players
Segunda División B players
CA Osasuna B players
CA Osasuna players
Córdoba CF players
Spain youth international footballers
Spain under-23 international footballers
Competitors at the 2005 Mediterranean Games
Mediterranean Games medalists in football
Mediterranean Games gold medalists for Spain